Heihachirō (written: 平八郎) is a masculine Japanese given name. Notable people with the name include:

, Japanese photographer
, Japanese samurai
, Imperial Japanese Navy admiral

Japanese masculine given names